Silea may refer to several people or places:

 Silea, a comune in Italy
 Şilea, a village in Fărău Commune, Alba County, Romania
 Silea, a village in Orlești Commune, Vâlcea County, Romania